Azad Abul Kalam (born 26 October 1966) is a Bangladeshi actor, director, writer and activist. He is one of the founders of Prachyanat and Prachyanat School of Acting and Design. He won Meril Prothom Alo Award for Best Playwright (Critics Choice) in 2012, for his television adaptation of Muhammed Zafar Iqbal’s novel, "Sabuj Velvet".

Career

Kalam was associated with the theater group Aranyak since October 1985. His debut stage acting was the in play Nanoker Pala, directed by Abdullah Hel Mahmud. He founded a theater group Prachyanat in 1997.

Kalam acted in television drama plays.

Awards
 Meril Prothom Alo Award for Best Playwright (Critics Choice)

Works

Films
 Kittonkhola (2000) by Abu Sayeed
 Phulkumar (2002) by Ashique Mostafa
 Lalon (2004) by Tanvir Mokammel
 Meherjaan (2011) by Rubaiyat Hossain
 Guerrilla (2011) by Nasiruddin Yousuff
 Brihonnola (2014) Murad Parvez  
 Krishnopokkho (2015) by Meher Afroz Shaon
 Khacha (2017) by Akram Khan 
 Alatchakra: Circle of Desire (2021) by Habibur Rahman
 Gunin (2021) by Giasuddin Selim
 Jibon Pakhi (2022) by Asad Sarkar

TV 
 Zindabahar (2022)

Web series 
 Nayan Rahasya (2019)

Theatre direction 

 Circus Circus
 A Man for All Seasons. 
 Koinna.
 Raja ... ebong Annanya
 Punorjonma. When We Dead Awaken
 Tragedy of Polashbari.
 Agunjatra.
 Achalayaton.
 Bou-Basanti.
 Half Akhrai.

References

External links

Living people
1966 births
Bangladeshi male stage actors
Bangladeshi male television actors
Bangladeshi male film actors
Notre Dame College, Dhaka alumni